The 2018 National Conference League was the 33rd season of the National Conference League, the top league for British amateur rugby league clubs.

The following are the results for each season:

Premier Division

Division One

Division Two

Division Three

References

National Conference League
2018 in rugby league
Rugby league in the United Kingdom
Rugby league competitions in the United Kingdom